Catherine Vautrin (born 26 July 1960) is a French politician of the Republicans (LR) who served as a member of the National Assembly of France, representing the Marne department.

Early life and career
Vautrin was born in Reims. Her husband, Jean-Loup Pennaforte is chief of internal medicine at the University Hospital of Reims. They have a daughter, Hortense, born in 2002.

Vautrin holds a Master of Business Law. In 1986, she started her professional activity by becoming a product manager in the American insurance company CIGNA after which she became director of marketing and communication in France and for Europe.

Political career
In 1983, at the request of Jean Falala, Vautrin became a municipal councilor in the city of Reims. At the time, she was the youngest of the team. In 1999, she left her job in the private sector to join the Regional Council of Champagne-Ardenne, where she held the position of Deputy Director General in charge of directions and operational services.

Member of the National Assembly, 2002–2004
In the 2022 elections, Vautrin became member of the National Assembly, representing the second district of the Marne and succeeding Jean-Claude Etienne. In parliament, she was a member of the Committee on Economic Affairs, as such she was:
 Member of la commission sur l’avenir aéroportuaire français (the Commission on the future French airports).
 First Vice-President of the mission for study of economic and social consequences of the legislation on working time.
 Secretary to the Economic Affairs Committee on the Budget of the Economy, Finance and Industry (post and telecommunications) 
 Secretary of the project on law concerning economic initiative

Career in government, 2004–2007

During the presidency of Jacques Chirac, on 31 March 2004, Vautrin was appointed Secretary of State for Integration and Equal Opportunities under minister Jean-Louis Borloo in the government of Prime Minister Jean-Pierre Raffarin. On October 28, 2004, she became Secretary of State for Seniors.

From June 2, 2005, Vautrin served as Minister Delegate for Social Cohesion and Parity in the government of Prime Minister Dominique de Villepin. In this capacity, she led efforts in 2005 on introducing French language tests for immigrants who apply for a 10-year residence permit. After a feud between the government and aid group Médecins du Monde that had been distributing tents to homeless people across Paris in August 2005, she pledged 7 million euros to help 1,000 homeless people get off the city’s streets by offering them long-term housing specially adapted to their needs. 

In April 2006, Vautrian was elected president of the Federation of the UMP. She was also appointed President Communication and Initiative Marne, club Jean-Pierre Raffarin of which she was a member of the National Office

Member of the National Assembly, 2007–2017

In the 2007 elections, Vautrin was re-elected with 56.93% of the vote. In the National Assembly, she was elected Vice-President of the Commission of Economic Affairs. She was a board member of the UMP in the National Assembly, under the leadership of the group´s chair Jean-François Copé.

On July 6, 2007, Vautrin officially announced her candidacy for mayor of Reims, in the context of French municipal elections of 2008. After the first round, March 9, 2008, Vautrin obtained 25.19% of the vote. She campaigned in the second round against the candidate of the Left Union Adeline Hazan, obtaining 43.93% of the vote despite the UMP nomination (given in the first round Renaud Dutreil) and was elected councilor opposition.

On June 25, 2008 Vautrin was designated by the members of the UMP group to become, as of October 2008, Vice-President of the National Assembly, replacing Marc-Philippe Daubresse whose peers did not reelect him.

On January 28, 2010, Vautrin was named president of French Commission for the Examination of Unfair Commercial Practices, replacing Jean-Paul Charié who had deceased. 

Vautrin advanced to the 1st Vice-President of the Assembly when Marc Laffineur was appointed to government in June 2011. In 2012, after switching to the left of the National Assembly, Laurence Dumont succeeded her as First Vice-President and she was appointed the fifth vice-president.

At the UMP´s 2012 congress, Vautrin supported the motion Gaullism, a way forward for France, led by Michèle Alliot-Marie, Roger Karoutchi, Henri Guaino and Patrick Ollier. In December 2012, following the resignation of Dominique Dord, she was appointed national treasurer of the UMP under the leadership of the party’s chair Jean-François Copé.

In 2015, Vautrin and Monique Rabin co-authored a report on the financing of consular missions.

Vautrin was one of the MPs who lost their seat in the 2017 French legislative election.

President of Grand Reims, 2014–present
Since 2014, Vautrin has been serving as president of Grand Reims.

Ahead of the Republicans’ 2016 primaries, Vautrin managed former President Nicolas Sarkozy’s campaign for the presidential nomination, alongside Éric Ciotti; Sarkozy eventually lost against François Fillon. Amid the Fillon affair, she later called on Fillon to resign as the party's candidate.

In the run-up to the 2022 presidential elections, Vautrin endorsed incumbent President Emmanuel Macron for re-election.

Following the 2022 legislative elections, Vautrin was considered by national news media a contender to succeed Jean Castex as Prime Minister of France.

Controversy
As part of an inquiry into UMP fundraising efforts started in late 2014, Vautrin was formally placed under investigation in April 2015, on suspicion of illicit funding.

References

1960 births
Living people
Politicians from Reims
The Republicans (France) politicians
Union for a Popular Movement politicians
Gaullism, a way forward for France
Government ministers of France
Secretaries of State of France
Women members of the National Assembly (France)
Deputies of the 12th National Assembly of the French Fifth Republic
Deputies of the 13th National Assembly of the French Fifth Republic
Deputies of the 14th National Assembly of the French Fifth Republic
21st-century French women politicians
Women government ministers of France